Andrew Roche (born 22 November 1971) is a Manx cyclist. He won the Rás Tailteann in 1997, and has competed at seven Commonwealth Games.

Early life
Roche grew up in Ramsey, Isle of Man.

Career

Roche began cycling competitively in 1984, aged 12, and began road racing in 1986. He competed in his first major tournament at the 1990 Commonwealth Games; he also appeared at the Games in 1994, 1998, 2002, 2006, 2010 and 2014. His best finish was at the 2006 road time trial, in which he finished 11th. He was second at the Manx International in 1992 and won the Rás Tailteann in 1997. Roche also competed at several Island Games and carried the Manx flag at the 2010 Commonwealth Games opening ceremony.

He currently works as a coach with his company, Watts Up Performance.

References

1971 births
Manx male cyclists
Rás Tailteann winners
Commonwealth Games competitors for the Isle of Man
People from Ramsey, Isle of Man
Living people
Cyclists at the 1990 Commonwealth Games
Cyclists at the 1994 Commonwealth Games
Cyclists at the 1998 Commonwealth Games
Cyclists at the 2002 Commonwealth Games
Cyclists at the 2006 Commonwealth Games
Cyclists at the 2010 Commonwealth Games
Cyclists at the 2014 Commonwealth Games